The Hino Liesse (kana:日野・リエッセ) is a step-floor minibus built by the Japanese automaker Hino Motors from 1995 to 2011. The range was primarily available as a city bus and a tourist coach.

Models 
KC-RX4JFAA (1995)
KK-RX4JFEA (1999)
PB-RX6JFAA (2004)
BDG-RX6JFBA (2007)

Liesse II 
The Hino Liesse II was a rebadged Toyota Coaster.
KC-HZB/HDB/BB40/50 (1996)
KK-HZB/HDB/BB40/50 (1999)
PB-XZB40/50 (2004)
BDG/PDG-XZB40/50 (2007)
SDG/SKG-XZB70/70M (2017)

See also 

 List of buses

External links 
Hino Liesse Homepage
Hino Liesse 2 official website(Japanese)

Liesse
Buses
Minibuses
Step-entrance buses
Coaches (bus)
Buses of Japan
Vehicles introduced in 1995